East Central High School is a public high school located in unincorporated east central Bexar County, Texas (USA) outside San Antonio. It is part of the East Central Independent School District and classified as a 6A school by the UIL. In 2015, the school was rated "Met Standard" by the Texas Education Agency.

Athletics
The East Central Hornets compete in the following sports - 

Baseball
Basketball
Cross Country
Dance
Football
Golf
Powerlifting
Soccer
Softball
Swimming
Ten-pin bowling
Tennis
Track and Field
Volleyball

State titles
Boys Basketball - 
1995(5A)
Girls Golf - 
1975(3A)

Notable alumni
 Henry Thomas - actor, most notable for the role of Elliott in E.T. the Extra-Terrestrial
 Michael Toudouze - former NFL player

References

External links
East Central High School

Public high schools in Bexar County, Texas